Raw View was a magazine of documentary photography. It was established in 2007 as Photo Raw and obtained its current title in November 2014. The editor-in-chief was Hannamari Shakya who works as a producer at the publishing company Musta Taide of Aalto University producing photography books.

Raw View was published by Soul Creations both in Finnish and English.

The last issue was released in November 2017. According to the press release, there was a demand for the magazine, but the financial challenges were too much in the end. Publisher Soul Creations continues with publishing photography books.  The tenth and last issue was dedicated to Finland.

Awards
 Quality Prize for Culture magazines 2009 by Ministry of Culture, Finland

Books
 Side/Bond, together with Musta Taide, the publishing company of Aalto University producing photography books

References

External links 
 
 Ville Kauko:  (pdf)  (Thesis on Photo Raw in Metropolia University of Applied Sciences, Helsinki; included an English abstract)
 Photoeditionberlin.com
 Arnis Balčus, Interview with the editor Hannamari Shakya in fkmagazine.

2007 establishments in Finland
2017 disestablishments in Finland
Defunct magazines published in Finland
English-language magazines
Finnish-language magazines
Magazines established in 2007
Magazines disestablished in 2017
Magazines published in Helsinki
Photography magazines
Triannual magazines